Joseph (Jean) Édouard Bommer (16 November 1829, Brussels – 19 February 1895, Brussels) was a Belgian botanist specializing in the field of pteridology. He was the husband of mycologist Elise Caroline Destrée de Bommer (1832-1910).

Despite no formal training in botany, in 1856 he acquired a position as an assistant at the Jardin Botanique National de Belgique. Here, he later served as curator and as a provisional director. In 1870 he became a professor at the state horticultural school in Vilvorde, followed by a professorship in botany at the University of Brussels (1872).

In 1862 he was a founding member of the Société Royale de Botanique de Belgique. He was also co-founder of the Société Belge de Microscopie.

Although he worked on different types of plants, he was primarily interested in ferns. At the time of his death, he was working on a monograph of the maidenhair fern genus, Adiantum. The genus Bommeria (E.Fourn. ex Baill.) of the family Pteridaceae is named in his honor.

Selected publications 
 Monographie de la classe des fougères : classification, 1867 - Monograph on ferns; classification.
 Notice sur le Jardin botanique de Bruxelles, 1871.
 Sur l'amylogenèse dans la règne végétal, 1874 - On amylogenesis within the plant kingdom.

References

External links 
 IPNI List of plants described and co-described by Jean-Edouard Bommer.

1829 births
1895 deaths
Scientists from Brussels
Pteridologists
19th-century Belgian botanists